Br'er Rabbit (an abbreviation of Brother Rabbit, also spelled Brer Rabbit) is a central figure in an oral tradition passed down by African-Americans of the Southern United States and African descendants in the Caribbean, notably Afro-Bahamians and Turks and Caicos Islanders. He is a trickster who succeeds by his wits rather than by brawn, provoking authority figures and bending social mores as he sees fit. Popular adaptations of the character, originally recorded by Joel Chandler Harris in the 19th century, include  Walt Disney Productions' Song of the South in 1946.



African origins 

The Br'er Rabbit stories can be traced back to trickster figures in Africa, particularly the hare that figures prominently in the storytelling traditions in West, Central, and Southern Africa. Among the Temne people in Sierra Leone, they tell children stories of a talking rabbit. Other regions of Africa also tell children stories of talking rabbits and other animals. These tales continue to be part of the traditional folklore of numerous peoples throughout those regions. In the Akan traditions of West Africa, the trickster is usually the spider Anansi, though the plots in his tales are often identical with those of stories of Br'er Rabbit. However, Anansi does encounter a tricky rabbit called "Adanko" (Asante-Twi to mean "Hare") in some stories. The Jamaican character with the same name "Brer Rabbit" is an adaptation of the Ananse stories of the Akan people.

Some scholars have suggested that in his American incarnation, Br'er Rabbit represented the enslaved Africans who used their wits to overcome adversity and to exact revenge on their adversaries, the white slave owners. Though not always successful, the efforts of Br'er Rabbit made him a folk hero. 

Several elements in the Brer Rabbit Tar Baby story (e.g., rabbit needing to be taught a lesson, punching and head butting the rabbit, the stuck rabbit being swung around and around) are reminiscent of those found in a Zimbabwe-Botswana folktale.

Folklorists in the late 19th century first documented evidence that the American versions of the stories originated among enslaved West Africans based on connections between Br'er Rabbit and Leuk, a rabbit trickster in Senegalese folklore.

American adaptations
Stories of Br'er Rabbit were written down by Robert Roosevelt, an uncle of U.S. President Theodore Roosevelt. Theodore Roosevelt wrote in his autobiography about his aunt from Georgia that "she knew all the 'Br'er Rabbit' stories, and I was brought up on them. One of my uncles, Robert Roosevelt, was much struck with them, and took them down from her dictation, publishing them in Harper's, where they fell flat. This was a good many years before a genius arose who, in 'Uncle Remus', made the stories immortal."

Some stories were also adapted by Joel Chandler Harris (1845–1908) for white audiences in the late 19th century. Harris invented Uncle Remus, an ex-slave narrator, as a storyteller and published many such stories that had been passed down by oral tradition. He claimed his stories were "the first graphic pictures of genuine negro life in the South." Harris also attributed the birth name Riley to Br'er Rabbit. Harris heard these tales in Georgia. Very similar versions of the same stories were recorded independently at the same time by the folklorist Alcée Fortier in southern Louisiana, where the Rabbit character was known as Compair Lapin in Creole. Enid Blyton, the English writer of children's fiction, retold the stories for children.

Cherokee parallels 
In a detailed study of the sources of Joel Chandler Harris's "Uncle Remus" stories, Florence Baer identified 140 stories with African origins, 27 stories with European origins, and 5 stories with Native American origins.

Although Joel Chandler Harris collected materials for his famous series of books featuring the character Br'er Rabbit in the 1870s, the Br'er Rabbit cycle had been recorded earlier among the Cherokees: The "tar baby" story was printed in an 1845 edition of the Cherokee Advocate, the same year Joel Chandler Harris was born.

Rabbit and Hare myths abound among Algonquin Indians in Eastern North America, particularly under the name Nanabozho. The Great Hare is generally worshipped among tribes in eastern Canada.

In "That the People Might Live: Native American Literatures and Native American Community" by Jace Weaver, the origins of Br'er Rabbit and other literature are discussed. Although the Cherokee had lived in isolation from Europeans in the remote past, a substantial amount of interaction was to occur among North American tribes, Europeans, and those from the enslaved population during the 18th and 19th centuries. It is impossible to ascertain whether the Cherokee story independently predated the African American story.

In a Cherokee tale about the briar patch, "the fox and the wolf throw the trickster rabbit into a thicket from which the rabbit quickly escapes." There was a "melding of the Cherokee rabbit-trickster ... into the culture of African slaves."

Joel Chandler Harris 

There are nine books by Joel Chandler Harris that contain Brer Rabbit stories:
Uncle Remus: His Songs and Sayings (1881), containing 25 Brer Rabbit stories.
Nights with Uncle Remus: Myths and Legends of the Old Plantation (1883), containing 52 Brer Rabbit stories.
Daddy Jake, the Runaway: And Short Stories Told After Dark (1889), containing 4 Brer Rabbit stories.
Uncle Remus and his Friends: Old Plantation Stories, Songs, and Ballads with Sketches of Negro Character (1892), containing 11 Brer Rabbit stories.
Told by Uncle Remus: New Stories of the Old Plantation (1905), containing 13 Brer Rabbit stories.
Uncle Remus and Brer Rabbit (1907), containing 4 Brer Rabbit stories.
Uncle Remus and the Little Boy (1910), containing 5 Brer Rabbit stories.
Uncle Remus Returns (1918), containing 6 Brer Rabbit stories.
Seven Tales of Uncle Remus (1948), containing 3 Brer Rabbit stories.

Enid Blyton 
There are eight books by Enid Blyton that are collections of stories featuring Brer Rabbit and friends, most of which appeared in various magazines in the late 1930s. 
Heyo, Brer Rabbit! (1938)
The Further Adventures of Brer Rabbit (1943)
My Enid Blyton Brer Rabbit Book (1948)
Enid Blyton's Brer Rabbit Book (1963)
Enid Blyton's Brer Rabbit Again (1963)
Enid Blyton's Brer Rabbit's a Rascal (1965)
Enid Blyton's Brer Rabbit Holiday Adventures (1974)
Enid Blyton's Brer Rabbit Funtime Adventures

In popular culture

Early comics

In 1902, artist Jean Mohr adapted the Uncle Remus stories into a two-page comic story titled Ole Br'er Rabbit for The North American.
The McClure Newspaper Syndicate released a Br'er Rabbit Sunday strip drawn by J.M. Condé from June 24 to October 7, 1906.

Disney version

The 1946 Disney film Song of the South is a frame story based on three Br'er Rabbit stories, "Br'er Rabbit Earns a Dollar a Minute", "The Laughing Place" and "The Tar Baby". The character of Br'er Rabbit was voiced by Johnny Lee in the film, and was portrayed as more of a "lovable trickster" than previous tales. Disney comics starring that version of Br'er Rabbit have been produced since 1946.
Splash Mountain, a thrill ride at Disneyland, Tokyo Disneyland and formerly at Magic Kingdom, is based on the above 1946 film's animated segments featuring Br'er Rabbit. Br'er Rabbit also appeared at the Walt Disney Parks and Resorts for meet-and-greets, parades and shows. He also appears as one of the guests in House of Mouse and Mickey's Magical Christmas: Snowed in at the House of Mouse, often seen hopping in the applauding crowd, as well as in the video game Kinect Disneyland Adventures. Starting with the Disneyland version of Splash Mountain in 1989, Jess Harnell has provided the voice of Br'er Rabbit in all of his modern Disney appearances.
An Uncle Remus and His Tales of Br'er Rabbit newspaper strip ran from October 14, 1946 through December 31, 1972.

Non-Disney
On April 21, 1972, astronaut John Young became the ninth person to step onto the Moon, and in his first words he stated, "I'm sure glad they got ol' Brer Rabbit, here, back in the briar patch where he belongs."
In 1975, the stories were retold for an adult audience in the cult animation film Coonskin, directed by Ralph Bakshi. 
In 1984, American composer Van Dyke Parks produced a children's album, Jump!, based on the Br'er Rabbit tales.
Rabbit Ears Productions produced two Br'er Rabbit tales ( Brer Rabbit and the Wonderful Tar Baby and Brer Rabbit and Boss Lion)
1998's Star Trek: Insurrection saw the Starship Enterprise enter a region of space called the Briar Patch.  At some point during a battle with the Son'a, Commander Riker states that it is "time to use the Briar Patch the way Br'er Rabbit did".
A direct-to-video film based on the stories, The Adventures of Brer Rabbit, was released in 2006. Nick Cannon provides his voice for the character.
There is a brand of molasses produced by B&G Foods named after the character.
in Sam Kieth’s The Maxx, the character Mr. Gone refers to Maxx as “Br’er Lappin” and indeed Maxx is worried if he removes his mask he will find he has a rabbit’s head beneath it.
in the 1982 film Savannah Smiles, Savannah tells a story of Brer rabbit to her captors Bootsie and Alvie.

See also 
 Gullah storytelling

References

Further reading
 Backus, Emma M. "Tales of the Rabbit from Georgia Negroes". In: Journal of American Folklore, Vol. 12 (1899). pp. 108–115.
 Edwards, Charles Lincoln. Bahama Songs And Stories. Boston and New York: Pub. by Houghton, Mifflin and company; [etc., etc.], 1895. (Bahaman stories about B' Rabby)
 Fortier, Alcée. and Alexander Street Press. Louisiana Folk-tales: In French Dialect And English Translation. Boston: Pub. for the American folk-lore society, by Houghton, Mifflin and company; [etc., etc.]. 1895. (stories of Compair Lapin collected in Louisiana)
 Marsh, Vivian Costroma Osborne. Types And Distribution of Negro Folk-lore In America. [Berkeley], 1922.
 Storr, Virgil Henry. "B’ Rabby as a 'True-True Bahamian': Rabbyism as Bahamian Ethos and Worldview in the Bahamas. Folk Tradition and the Works of Strachan and Glinton-Meicholas (January 1, 2009)". In: Journal of Caribbean Literatures. Vol. 6, No. 1, pp. 121–142, 2009, Available at SSRN: https://ssrn.com/abstract=1711268

External links

 The Wrens Nest 100 Years OF Telling Tales
 Full text of Joel Chandler Harris from Project Gutenberg
 Brer Rabbit Stories at AmericanFolklore.net
 Robert Roosevelt's Brer Rabbit stories
 Theodore Roosevelt autobiography on Brer Rabbit and his Uncle
 Inducks' index of Disney comic stories featuring Br'er Rabbit
 Archived audio recording of an educational ArtsSmarts elementary school recording of "Brother Rabbit and Tar Baby"
 Devin The Dude's song Briar Patch

 
American folklore
Georgia folklore
African-American cultural history
Folklore of the Southern United States
Rabbits and hares in literature
Fictional rabbits and hares
Fictional tricksters
Song of the South characters
Male characters in literature
Male characters in comics
Male characters in animation
Characters in American novels of the 19th century
Disney comics characters
Comics about rabbits and hares
Comics about bears
Comics set in forests
Literary characters introduced in 1881
Comics characters introduced in 1946
Comedy literature characters
Folklore characters
Trickster gods